Dinuk Wijeratne  (born 1978) is a conductor, composer and pianist, living and working in Ottawa, Ontario, Canada. His work Two Pop Songs on Antique Poems  won both the 2016 Juno Award for Classical Composition of the Year and the 2016 East Coast Music Award for Classical Composition of the Year. His boundary-crossing musical collaborations include ground-breaking combinations of symphony orchestra and tabla, and string quartet and DJ.

Early life and education 

Wijeratne was born in Sri Lanka, and grew up in Dubai, UAE. He studied at the Royal Northern College of Music in the UK, and with John Corigliano at Juilliard in New York City. In 2005 his family moved to Nova Scotia.

Career
Wijeratne made his Carnegie Hall debut in 2004 as a conductor, composer and pianist, performing with Yo Yo Ma and the Silk Road Ensemble.    He became the Music Director for the Nova Scotia Youth Orchestra  in 2006, and held a 3-year appointment as Conductor-in-Residence with Symphony Nova Scotia.

In 2013 Wijeratne conducted the Elizabeth Bishop Players as they recorded music accompanying soprano Suzie LeBlanc for the album I Am In Need of Music.

In 2016 Wijeratne's composition "Two Pop Songs on Antique Poems", from the Afriara Quartet's album Spin Cycle, won a Juno Award as Classical Composition of the Year.

He was commissioned by the Calgary Philharmonic to compose "First Winter", a movement for its 2017 True North: Symphonic Ballet. The piece combines the work of five composers, and was premiered at the True North Festival in celebration of Canada's 150th birthday. "First Winter" was also performed by the Toronto Symphony Orchestra at the 21C Festival in 2019.

Selected works 
 Tsimo! (2012)
 Tabla Concerto (2011) The first full length Tabla Concerto for tabla and full Western classical Symphony Orchestra
 'Brazil, January 1, 1502' (2011)
 Solea di Diomira (2010)
 Colour Study in Rupaktaal (2007)
Two Pop Songs on Antique Poems (2015) Winner of both the 2016 Juno Award and the 2016 East Coast Music Award for Classical Composition of the Year
Polyphonic Lively (2016) Winner of the 2017 Lieutenant Governor of Nova Scotia Masterworks Arts Award
Clarinet Concerto (2018)

References

External links
 Official web page
 

Canadian male classical composers
Canadian classical composers
Male conductors (music)
Canadian classical pianists
Male classical pianists
Canadian male pianists
Alumni of the Royal Northern College of Music
Juilliard School alumni
Sri Lankan emigrants to Canada
Living people
Juno Award for Classical Composition of the Year winners
21st-century Canadian conductors (music)
21st-century classical pianists
21st-century Canadian male musicians
1978 births